Eugène Edouard Bernard Lacomblé (26 October 1896 – 28 February 1942) was an officer in the Royal Netherlands Navy from 1914 to 1942. He began and ended his career on board a ship named after Admiral Michiel Adriaenszoon de Ruyter.

Life
After Higher Civic School (Hogere Burger School, HBS), Lacomblé trained in navigation at the Royal Netherlands Naval College in Willemsoord in 1914. In 1917 he was promoted to lieutenant (Lieutenant ter Zee or LtZ) 3rd class and was posted to the East Indies. There he was assigned to the De Ruyter, then under the command of LtZ N. Maats. Three months later he was made lieutenant second class and posted to the torpedo service on board the torpedo training ship HNLMS Koningin Emma der Nederlanden. He then moved into submarines until the end of 1927, making some trips back to the Netherlands. In 1928, as lieutenant second class, he was made first officer on board the Brino and within a year rose to lieutenant first class.

In 1931 he went to the East Indies for the third time, this time on the mail-ship Christiaan Huygens. Upon arrival in Surabaya he was, as first officer, placed in the Naval Barracks at Goebeng. At the start of 1932 he was transferred to HNLMS De Zeven Provinciën and in the summer was made equipagemeester of the Surabaya Naval Establishment. Three years later he returned to the Netherlands and at the end of 1935 was given command of the minelayer Douwe Aukes, stationed at Ostend and Rouen. He then spent a few months on the naval staff at the Department of Defence. In 1938 Lacomblé went to the East Indies for the fourth and final time, now on board M.S. Mamix van Sint Aldegonde. After arriving there he was made first officer of the cruiser De Ruyter, then commanded by KtZ H.J. Bueninck. On 1 February 1940 Lacomblé was promoted to Kapitein-LtZ. During the Japanese invasion of the East Indies he was the commander of the De Ruyter, from which Karel Doorman commanded the 'Combined Striking Force'. On 27 February the De Ruyter was hit by a Japanese torpedo during the Battle of the Java Sea and Doorman and Lacomblé got the crew off the ship, though they went down with it themselves.

Namesakes
Hr. MS. Lacomblé, a Van Straelen class minesweeper is named after Eugène Lacomblé.

Honours

 He won the eereteeken for long service as an officer.
On 28 May 1949 he was made Knight, 4th class in the Military William Order, with the following citation:

1896 births
1942 deaths
People from Arnhem
Royal Netherlands Naval College alumni
Royal Netherlands Navy officers
Royal Netherlands Navy personnel of World War II
Dutch military personnel killed in World War II
Knights Fourth Class of the Military Order of William
Captains who went down with the ship